What a Horrible Night to Have a Curse is a demo album by the American metal band The Black Dahlia Murder, released independently in May 2001. It is the band's only record to feature Sean Gauvreau on bass. Although The Black Dahlia Murder is considered to be a melodic death metal band, the style of the demo has been described as metalcore. Vocalist Trevor Strnad said in an interview that much of the material on the demo is a blatant "rip-off" of the metalcore band Prayer for Cleansing.

Its title is derived from the NES game Castlevania II: Simon's Quest, where it appears in a text box during the in-game transition from day to night. An eponymous song was later recorded for the band's 2007 album Nocturnal. The song "The Hive" was later re-recorded for the band's 2002 EP, A Cold-Blooded Epitaph where it was re-titled "Burning the Hive".

Track listing

Personnel
The Black Dahlia Murder
 John Deering – lead guitar
 Brian Eschbach – rhythm guitar
 Cory Grady – drums
 Sean Gauvreau – bass guitar
 Trevor Strnad – vocals

References

The Black Dahlia Murder (band) albums
2001 albums
Demo albums
Self-released albums